Sadnecessary is the debut studio album by German duo Milky Chance. It was released in Germany on 1 October 2013. The album includes the singles "Stolen Dance" and "Down by the River". The album peaked at number 14 in Germany, and charted at 17 on the Billboard 200 chart.

Production and release
Sadnecessary is the debut studio album by the group, released in Germany on 1 October 2013. It was released in the United States a year later, on 14 October 2014.

Singles
 "Stolen Dance" was released as the lead single from the album on 5 April 2013. The song reached number one in Ireland, Austria, France, Belgium, Switzerland, Poland, Czech Republic, and Hungary.
 "Down by the River", a song from Sadnecessary, was re-released as a single on 28 March 2014 in Germany through Lichtdicht Records. The song charted in France, Germany, Switzerland and United Kingdom, and also appears in FIFA 15.

Reception

The album peaked at number 14 in Germany, and charted at 17 on the Billboard 200 chart. The group toured in support of the album, and on 5 December 2013, they won the 1Live Krone radio awards for the Best Single with "Stolen Dance".

It received largely positive press, and within a day of its release in 2014, Spin named Sadnecessary their Album of the Week. Spin further described the leading single "Stolen Dance" as a "serenely rollicking crossover jam", clarifying that the song "is no red herring — the great majority of Sadnecessary follows in its pattern of low-octane beats and gently lapping guitar strumming, making for a lovely and understated album." Remarking on Rehbein's "weathered" vocal style, Billboard said the band's "less-is-more aesthetic puts it front and center, where it will either enchant or annoy listeners."

Awards

Track listing

Charts

Weekly charts

Year-end charts

Certifications

Release history

References

2014 debut albums
Milky Chance albums
European Border Breakers Award-winning albums